Ano Scholari is a village of the Thermi municipality. Before the 2011 local government reform it was part of the municipality of Mikra. The 2011 census recorded 178 inhabitants in the village. Ano Scholari is a part of the community of Trilofo.

See also
List of settlements in the Thessaloniki regional unit

References

Populated places in Thessaloniki (regional unit)